Paramiella is a genus of land snails with gills and an operculum, a terrestrial gastropod mollusk in the family Neocyclotidae.

Species
Species within the genus Paramiella include:
 Paramiella incisa
 Paramiella kondoi

References

Neocyclotidae
Taxonomy articles created by Polbot